Samuel Takyi (born 23 December 2000) is a Ghanaian boxer. He competed in the men's featherweight division in the 2020 Summer Olympics, beating Jean Caicedo of Ecuador in the first round. He went on to defeat David Avila Ceiber of Colombia in the quarter final, a win which earned him a bronze medal but lost to Duke Ragan of the USA in the semi final bout.

Early life and education 
Takyi is the son of Eunice Smith, who is a fish monger at the Makola Market and Godfred Takyi a cloth trader. He began his education at St. Mary's Nursery & Preparatory School and went on to Bishop Mixed Junior High School. He later joined the Discipline Gym and made it into the Black Bombers team, which is the boxing squad of Ghana. Samuel began to box at the age of 8 and was also good at football but opted for the gloves due to the popularity of the sport in Ussher and Jamestown where he lived.

Honours 
Takyi won the 2022 Sports Man of the Year at Citi TV's Entertainment Achievement Awards for the 2021 year under review.

External links 
 Samuel Takyi  at 2020 Tokyo Olympics

References 

Living people
2000 births
Ghanaian male boxers
Olympic boxers of Ghana
Boxers from Accra
Boxers at the 2020 Summer Olympics
Medalists at the 2020 Summer Olympics
Olympic bronze medalists for Ghana
Olympic medalists in boxing